William Michael Zabka (born October 20, 1965) is an American actor. He is best known for his role as Johnny Lawrence in The Karate Kid (1984), The Karate Kid Part II (1986) and the TV series Cobra Kai (2018–present). In 2004, he was nominated for an Academy Award for co-writing and producing the short film Most.

Early life
Zabka was born in New York City, the son of Nancy, a business liaison, producer, and production assistant, and Stan Zabka, a director, writer and composer. He has a brother and a sister. His father was born in Des Moines, Iowa of Czech descent; he was assistant director of The Tonight Show Starring Johnny Carson during the first two years of Carson's tenure, and worked as production manager on a number of motion pictures, including the Chuck Norris film Forced Vengeance (1982).

In 1983, Zabka graduated from El Camino Real Charter High School in Los Angeles before briefly attending California State University, Northridge and majoring in film.

Career
Zabka's breakout acting role came in his first movie, The Karate Kid (1984). He played Johnny Lawrence, the main antagonist to the title character and protagonist played by Ralph Macchio. He had no training in karate at the time but was an accomplished wrestler. His participation in the film inspired him to learn the martial art of Tang Soo Do and he later earned a second degree green belt.

During the 1980s, Zabka appeared in the comedy movies Just One of the Guys (1985) and Back to School (1986). Zabka also co-starred on the CBS television series The Equalizer as the son of the title character (1986–89). He also played Jack, Audrey's jock boyfriend, in National Lampoon's European Vacation (1985). He later tried to step away from playing the class bully character. He mentioned in an interview how he was sometimes hassled in public by random people because of the villainous characters he was best known for.

During the 1990s and 2000s, he acted mostly in independent films while studying to be a filmmaker. In 2003, he wrote and produced the short film Most, shot on location in the Czech Republic and Poland. Most (aka The Bridge) had its world premiere at the Sundance Film Festival 2003 and won numerous awards at prestigious film festivals, including Best of Festival at the Palm Springs International Festival of Short Films in 2003. In 2004, he was nominated for an Academy Award for Most in the Live Action Short Film category.

In 2007, Zabka directed and starred in a music video for the band No More Kings 
titled "Sweep the Leg". The video stars Zabka as a caricature of himself, living in a trailer in the desert and obsessed with his role in The Karate Kid. The video includes cameos by several of the original Karate Kid cast members, including Martin Kove and Ralph Macchio. In 2010, Zabka directed Rascal Flatts in their music video for the song "Why Wait" and also directed the video for their 2017 hit "Yours If You Want It". Also in 2010, Zabka made a cameo appearance in the comedy movie Hot Tub Time Machine. In 2013, Zabka, along with Macchio, guest starred in the season 8 episode of How I Met Your Mother, "The Bro Mitzvah". Zabka also appeared in several episodes of the sitcom's ninth season. Zabka also directed commercials for clients including Little Tikes and Verizon at Heresy in Venice, California. 

On August 4, 2017, it was announced that Zabka would reprise his role as Johnny Lawrence in a 10-episode Karate Kid revival series for YouTube Red titled Cobra Kai that debuted in 2018. He also co-executive produces the series with Ralph Macchio. The series begins 33 years after the events of the first film, and revolves around a down and out Johnny who, seeking to rebuild his life, reopens the Cobra Kai dojo. It reignites his rivalry with a now-successful Daniel LaRusso (Macchio), who has been struggling to maintain balance in his life without the guidance of his now-deceased mentor, Mr. Miyagi.

Personal life
He married Stacie Zabka in 2008 and they have two children.

Filmography

Award nominations

References

External links

 
 
 
 Profile, zabka.com

1965 births
Living people
Male actors from New York City
American male film actors
Film producers from New York (state)
American male screenwriters
American male television actors
American people of Czech descent
American tang soo do practitioners
Screenwriters from New York (state)
20th-century American male actors
21st-century American male actors